Caulastrocecis gypsella is a moth of the family Gelechiidae. It is found in France.

The wingspan is 16–20 mm.

The larvae feed on Aster acris.

References

Moths described in 1893
Caulastrocecis
Moths of Europe